Van Barneveld is a Dutch surname. Notable people with the surname include:

Harry Van Barneveld (born 1967), Belgian judoka
Joos van Barneveld (born 1982), Dutch footballer and graffiti artist
Raymond van Barneveld (born 1967), Dutch darts player

Dutch-language surnames